Grant's First Stand is the debut album by American jazz guitarist Grant Green featuring performances by Green recorded and released on the Blue Note label in 1961. He is featured in a trio with organist Baby Face Willette and drummer Ben Dixon. Earlier recordings made by Green for Blue Note were released as First Session in 2001.

Reception 

The Allmusic review by Steve Huey awarded the album 4½ stars and stated: "Grant's First Stand still ranks as one of his greatest pure soul-jazz outings, a set of killer grooves laid down by a hard-swinging organ trio."

Track listing 
All compositions by Grant Green except as indicated

 "Miss Ann's Tempo" – 5:38
 "Lullaby of the Leaves" (Bernice Petkere, Joe Young) – 7:41
 "Blues for Willarene" – 7:08
 "Baby's Minor Lope" (Baby Face Willette) – 7:19
 "'Tain't Nobody's Bizness If I Do" (Porter Grainger) – 4:26
 "A Wee Bit O'Green" – 7:49

Personnel 
Grant Green – guitar
Baby Face Willette – organ
Ben Dixon – drums

References 

Blue Note Records albums
Grant Green albums
1961 debut albums
Albums produced by Alfred Lion
Albums recorded at Van Gelder Studio